Terry Kitchen (born Max Pokrivchak in Phillipsburg, New Jersey) is an American folk singer-songwriter. He grew up in Bethlehem and Easton, Pennsylvania and Findlay, Ohio and attended college at Occidental College and the Guitar Institute of Technology.

After college, he moved to Boston and fronted the 1980s pop/rock band Loose Ties before moving on to a solo career in acoustic music. He has performed in New England coffeehouses and folk festivals, as well as nationally, ever since.

He derived his stage name from a character in Kurt Vonnegut, Jr.'s 1988 novel, Bluebeard.  Vonnegut's Terry Kitchen was a talented member of the Abstract Expressionist movement.

Discography
Max Po-KRIV-chak (1991)
Blues and Grace (1993)
I Own This Town (1995)
Blanket (1997)
Blues for Cain & Abel (1999)
Perpendicular Universe: Loose Ties 1982–1988 (2001) (with Loose Ties)
Right Now (2002)
That's How It Used To Be (2004)
 Includes the track "The Greatest Game They Never Played" about the 1949 Sun Bowl controversy
heaven here on earth (2006)
Summer to Snowflakes (2009)
Songs from Next Big Thing (2013)
The Post-American-Century (2015)
The Quiet Places (2017)
Rubies in the Dust (2018)
Where the Action Is: Loose Ties 1985 (2018) (with Loose Ties)
Next Time We Meet (2020)
Lost Songs (2021)

References

External links
Terry Kitchen Official Web Site.

American male singers
Songwriters from New Jersey
American folk musicians
Singers from New Jersey
Occidental College alumni
People from Bethlehem, Pennsylvania
Musicians from Easton, Pennsylvania
People from Phillipsburg, New Jersey
Living people
Songwriters from Pennsylvania
Year of birth missing (living people)
American male songwriters